West Harrow is a London Underground station in Harrow in north west London.

The station is on the Uxbridge branch of the Metropolitan line, between Rayners Lane and Harrow-on-the-Hill stations, and in Travelcard Zone 5. It is the only station on the Uxbridge branch to be served exclusively by the Metropolitan.

History
The Metropolitan (Harrow and Uxbridge Railway) line passed through here between Harrow-on-the-Hill and Ruislip, with services beginning on 4 July 1904. West Harrow station opened on 17 November 1913.

The line here passes over the road where The Gardens becomes Vaughan Road.

The station is one of the few underground stations without ticket barriers at one of the entrances, with passengers travelling towards Uxbridge able to access the platforms without passing a ticket barrier.

Services

Metropolitan line 
The Metropolitan line is the only line to operate an express service, though currently for Metropolitan line trains on the Uxbridge branch this is southbound only in the morning peaks (06:30 to 09:30) Monday to Friday.

The semi-fast trains do not stop at Northwick Park, Preston Road and Wembley Park.

The off-peak service in trains per hour (tph) is:
 8 tph to Aldgate (all stations)
 8 tph to Uxbridge

The morning peak service in trains per hour (tph) is:
 2 tph to Aldgate (semi-fast)
 4 tph to Aldgate (all stations)
 4 tph to Baker Street (all stations)
 10 tph to Uxbridge

The evening peak service in trains per hour (tph) is:
 7 tph to Aldgate (all stations)
 3 tph to Baker Street (all stations)
 10 tph to Uxbridge

Gallery

References

Metropolitan line stations
Tube stations in the London Borough of Harrow
Former Metropolitan Railway stations
Railway stations in Great Britain opened in 1913
1913 establishments in England